Follicular Cyst may refer to:

 Dentigerous cyst
 Follicular cyst of ovary